Western Ware is an album by the American synth-pop/electropop band Hyperbubble from Fellowshipwreck released on February 26, 2017. An aim of the collection was to follow through on the promise of band member Jess DeCuir to "plan to produce, mix and create the first electro Country & Western LP" since the work of Gil Trythall. One reviewer noted that the recording also marked a change for Hyperbubble in that while Jess is regarded as "the voice of band, ...on this album Jeff (DeCuir) cleans up rather nicely as lead vocalist on a good number of tracks."

The album includes Aleah Metzger Hendricks on all backing vocals for "Queen of the Roller Derby" and adding backing vocals to four other tracks. Their cover of "Rhinestone Cowboy" features Rikki & Daz's John Matthews (Ricardo Autobahn) accompanying on synthesizer and Daz Sampson as MC. Their contribution was recorded at Glen Campbell's home at the time they recorded their own UK Top 20 version of the hit song.

Most tracks cover popular songs by noted country music artists with two exceptions. One is the short track "Luminaria," recorded live at the San Antonio Museum of Art during the citywide event of the same name.

The second is the debut of "Digital Cowboy," the title track composed but never produced by Our Daughter's Wedding for their 1981 album. For this song, Our Daughter's Wedding member Scott Simon performs with Hyperbubble on lead synthesizer.

The album title incidentally copies that of a single Hyperbubble previously recorded for a 2011 compilation entitled Western, produced by Winter Records.

Critical reception
The release was called "a rare crossover" Country and Western album that "is synthpop at its core;" "a wild west of urban cowboys, honkey-tonk angels and truck-driving women." Through "a hoedown of bouncy and bombastic country-western covers," band members Jess and Jeff DeCuir dubbed "electronic music's own Carter & Cash" eschew the "twang and wail of traditional country instruments."
As a substitute "on the 'Nashville in the 23rd Century' rendition of 'Boney Fingers,' Jess DeCuir's theremin is a most perfect Country instrument as it hauntingly twangs." Pansentient League reviewer Jer White wrote that "Hyperbubble are fast becoming the masters of conceptual synthpop, what with this delightful album and things like last year's synthpop coloring book Music to Color By."

Their "The Electric Horseman" was described as "a meaty take on the instrumental from the Robert Redford film of the same name" and that it represents an "extended (version) from the original which incidentally also featured a sequencer line." Chain D.L.K. gave the album 3 out of 5 stars and Pansentient League named it a Top Ten for 2017.

Track listing

Personnel

Musicians
 Jess DeCuir – lead vocals, synthesizers, theremin, stylophone 
 Jeff DeCuir – lead vocals, sequencer, synthesizers, drumtronics

Additional personnel
 Aleah Metzger Hendricks – vocals
 Scott Simon – synthesizer
 Daz Sampson – MC
 John Matthews – synthesizer

Production
 Producers – Jess and Jeff DeCuir
 Head engineer – Hyperbubble
 Engineer for Daz Sampson vocals – Ricardo Autobahn
 Photography – Hyperbubble, Joe Wallace

References

Synth-pop albums by American artists
2017 albums